Donggang District is the main urban district of the city of Rizhao, Shandong province, China. All the main government agencies of the city, as well as the Port of Rizhao, are located in this district.

Administrative divisions
As 2012, this district is divided to 5 subdistricts and 7 towns.
Subdistricts

Towns

References

External links 
 Government website of Donggang district
 Information page

County-level divisions of Shandong
Rizhao